Rodeo is a traditional North American sport.

Rodeo may also refer to:

Competitions
Air Mobility Rodeo, an international airlift competition
Charreada, Mexican rodeo, the national sport of Mexico
Chilean rodeo, the national sport of Chile
Playboating or Freestyle Kayaking (formerly "Rodeo"), a form of whitewater paddling

Places 
 Argentina:
 Rodeo, San Juan
 Mexico:
 Rodeo, Durango
 Rodeo Municipality
 Los Rodeos, airport in Tenerife, Spain; now called Tenerife North Airport
 United States:
 Rodeo Drive, Beverly Hills, California, United States
 Communities:
 Rodeo, California
 Rodeo, New Mexico

Arts, entertainment, and media

Music
 Rodeo (Travis Scott album), a 2015 album by Travis Scott
 Rodéo (Zazie album), a 2004 album by Zazie
 "Rodeo" (Garth Brooks song), 1991
 "Rodeo" (Juvenile song), 2006
 "Rodeo" (Lil Nas X and Cardi B song), 2019
 "Rodeo", a 2016 single by Chancellor

Other uses in arts, entertainment, and media
 Rodeo (ballet), a ballet choreographed by Agnes de Mille and scored by Aaron Copland
 Rodeo: Four Dance Episodes, a ballet choreographed by Justin Peck to music by Aaron Copland
 Rodeo, a bull villager from the video game series Animal Crossing
 Rodeo (1952 film), a 1952 film directed by William Beaudine
 Rodeo (2022 Canadian film), a film directed by Joëlle Desjardins Paquette
 Rodeo (2022 French film), a film directed by Lola Quivoron 
 Rodéo (Lucky Luke), a Lucky Luke book
 "Rodeo", a 1977 episode of The Bionic Woman
 A Rodeo Film, 2019 film directed by Darius Dawson

Vehicles
Holden Rodeo, a pick-up truck
Isuzu Rodeo, a midsize sport utility vehicle
Renault Rodeo, a series of open cars produced by ACL

Other uses
Rodéo (riot), a technique of rioting
 Rodeo, a RAF World War II code name for fighter sweeps over enemy territory
 Rodeo, a Dow Chemical Company herbicide containing glyphosate

See also
El Rodeo (disambiguation)
Rodeio